Ua-Ildak (Ua-ildak) is, in ancient Mesopotamian religion, a goddess responsible for pastures and poplar trees.

References 

Michael Jordan, Encyclopedia of Gods, Kyle Cathie Limited, 2002

Mesopotamian goddesses
Agricultural goddesses
Nature goddesses